The False Step or The Step off the Path is a 1939 German historical drama film directed by Gustaf Gründgens and starring Marianne Hoppe, Karl Ludwig Diehl and Paul Hartmann.  It is an adaptation of Theodor Fontane's 1896 novel Effi Briest.

Cast

References

External links

Der Schritt vom Wege Full movie at the Deutsche Filmothek

German historical drama films
1930s historical drama films
Films directed by Gustaf Gründgens
Films based on German novels
Films based on works by Theodor Fontane
Films set in Prussia
Films set in the 1880s
Films of Nazi Germany
German black-and-white films
1939 drama films
1930s German films